Prospect is a Slovenian progressive metal band from Ljubljana founded in 1991. Their influences include Queensrÿche, Fates Warning, Dream Theater and Iron Maiden. To be directed at the international market, the band writes all their lyrics in English.

History
The band was founded in 1999 when their first album, #1 was released. The album was warmly accepted among local heavy metal fans and also abroad. In 2002, their second album, Moments, was released and Simon Jovanovič left the band and started his own project, Unspoken. After a long time of searching, Robi Grdič replaced him as vocalist. At some of their concerts, they were an opening band of Paul Di'Anno (former Iron Maiden member) during his tour in Ljubljana and Zagreb in 2001. For most of October 2003, they participated at The Bonded by Metal tour across Europe with bands such as Exodus, Agent Steel, Mortitian and Nuclear Assault. In 2005, they supported the band Queensrÿche during the Austrian part of their tour. Their new album, Chronicles of Men, was released in 2007. The official anthem of Metalcamp is written and performed by Prospect. The song can be downloaded from the Metalcamp homepage for free.

Band members

Current
 Roman Fileš − guitar
 Dejan Pakiz − keyboards
 Robi Grdic − vocals
 Urban Medic − bass guitar
 Peter Mlinar − drums

Former
 Jure Pockaj − vocals
 Simon Jovanovič − vocals
 Rok Plestenjak − keyboard
 Žele Jokič − bass guitar

Discography
 #1 (1999)
 Moments (2002)
 Chronicles of Men (2007)

External links

 Official website
 Review of No. 1 at DURP
 Review of Moments at 1heavymetal.com

Progressive metal musical groups
Slovenian heavy metal musical groups
Musical groups established in 1991
Musical groups from Ljubljana
1991 establishments in Slovenia